Carcassonne is a medieval fortified city in France.

Carcassonne may also refer to:
 Cité de Carcassonne
 Carcassonne (board game), a board game by Klaus-Jürgen Wrede
 Carcassonne (video game), a video game adaptation
 Carcassonne Castle, a residence in the United States
 Joseph ben Solomon of Carcassonne, 11th century liturgical poet

See also
 Carcassonne Salvaza Airport, an airport in the town of Carcassonne
 Carcassonne Cathedral, a cathedral in Carcassonne, the seat of the Roman Catholic Bishop of Carcassonne